P. Mitterstieler  was an Italian luger who competed in the early 1970s. A natural track luger, he won a gold medal in the men's doubles event at the 1973 FIL European Luge Natural Track Championships in Taisten, Italy.

References
Natural track European Championships results 1970-2006.

Year of birth missing (living people)
Living people
Missing middle or first names
Sportspeople from Südtirol
Italian male lugers